Mette Viscovich (née Pedersen; born 30 September 1973) is a retired Danish badminton player from Skovshoved, Useedet club. Trained at Nørre Broby, she has represented her country in big competitions such as World championships, Sudirman cup, Uber cup and European championships as well. She is known for her modest attacking play with fine technical skills; masked with good strokes and good net play.

Achievements

European Championships 
Women's singles

European Junior Championships 
Girls' singles

Girls' doubles

IBF Grand Prix 
Women's singles

IBF International 
Women's singles

Women's doubles

References

External links 

1973 births
Living people
Danish female badminton players
20th-century Danish women
21st-century Danish women